USS Monsoon (PC-4) is the fourth . Monsoon was laid down by Bollinger Shipyards, Lockport, Louisiana on 15 February 1992 and launched 10 October 1992. She was commissioned 22 January 1994 by the United States Navy. She was decommissioned 1 October 2004 and loaned to the United States Coast Guard as USCGC Monsoon (WPC-4). She was returned to the U.S. Navy on 22 August 2008.

History

U.S. Coast Guard

During her time as a U.S. Coast Guard cutter, Monsoon, along with  helped with the arrest of Mexican drug kingpin Francisco Javier Arellano Félix in 2006 while he was deep-sea fishing off the Baja Peninsula. The crew of Monsoon took him into custody and his U.S. registered fishing boat, Dock Holiday, was towed back to San Diego from international waters by a Coast Guard patrol boat.

Notes
Citations

References used

External links

FAS

 

Cyclone-class patrol ships
Ships of the United States Coast Guard
Ships built in Lockport, Louisiana
1992 ships